Daniel Summerhill (born February 13, 1989 in Englewood, Colorado) is an American cyclist, who is suspended from the sport after a positive drugs test for Adderall.

Major results

Road

2007
 7th Road race, UCI Junior World Championships
 9th Overall Tour de l'Abitibi
1st Stage 2 (TTT)
2008
 7th Paris–Roubaix Espoirs
2010
 3rd Overall Tour of China
2012
 10th Grand Prix de la Ville de Lillers
2013
 9th Bucks County Classic
2014
 8th Overall Tour of Alberta
2015
 1st The Reading 120
 6th Philly Cycling Classic
2017
 1st Stage 1 (ITT) Tour of Japan
 7th Overall Tour de Taiwan
1st Stage 3

Cyclo-cross

2005–2006
 1st  National Junior Championships
 1st Surf City Juniors
 1st Gran Prix of Gloucester Juniors Day 1
 2nd Gran Prix of Gloucester Juniors Day 2
 2nd Golden Gate Cross Juniors
 2nd Rad Racing GP Juniors
 2nd Stumptown Classic Juniors
2006–2007
 1st  National Junior Championships
 1st Xilinx Cup Juniors
 1st Boulder Cup Juniors
 2nd  UCI Junior World Championships
 Junior Superprestige
3rd Diegem
 Junior GvA Trophy
3rd Baal
 3rd Gran Prix of Gloucester Juniors Day 2
2007–2008
 3rd National Under-23 Championships
2008–2009
 3rd National Under-23 Championships
2009–2010
 1st  National Under-23 Championships
2010–2011
 1st  National Under-23 Championships
 1st Krosstober-fest Weekend Day 2
2011–2012
 3rd USGP of Cyclocross Day 1
2012–2013
 2nd Boulder Cup
 3rd Derby City Cup Day 1
2013–2014
 1st Trek Collective Cup Day 2
 3rd Derby City Cup Day 2
 3rd CXLA Weekend Day 1
2014–2015
 1st Ellison Park Festival Day 2
 1st Day 1 & 2, Derby City Cup
 1st Harbin Park Day 1
 2nd Ellison Park Festival Day 1
2015–2016
 1st Day 1 & 2, North Carolina Grand Prix
 1st US Open of Cyclocross Day 2
 2nd US Open of Cyclocross Day 1
 3rd The Derby City Cup Day 2
2016–2017
 2nd Gran Prix of Gloucester Day 1
 2nd KingsCX Day 2
 2nd Ruts N Guts Day 1
 3rd  Pan American Championships
 3rd Jingle Cross C2 Race
 3rd Gran Prix of Gloucester Day 2
 3rd Rochester Day 2
 3rd KMC Cyclo-cross Festival Day 2

Track
2017
 1st  Team pursuit (with Adrian Hegyvary, Daniel Holloway & Gavin Hoover), National Championships
 2nd  Team pursuit, Pan American Championships
2018
 2nd Team pursuit, Hong Kong, UCI World Cup

References

External links

1989 births
Living people
American male cyclists
American track cyclists
Cyclo-cross cyclists
People from Englewood, Colorado